Alexander Anatolyevich Yakobson is an Israeli historian, professor of Ancient history at the Hebrew University of Jerusalem, political activist, and commentator.

Background

Alexander Anatolyevich Yakobson was born on October 5, 1959, in Moscow. His parents were Soviet dissidents Anatoly Yakobson and Maya Ulanovskaya.  His grandparents were Soviet spies Alexander Ulanovsky and Nadezhda Ulanovskaya.  Yakobson immigrated to Israel with his family (mother, father, and grandmother) at age 13. He earned his degrees from the Hebrew University of Jerusalem: BA cum laude in History and Political Science (1985), MA in History (1989), and doctorate in Ancient History (1995). He also conducted postdoctoral research at the University of Cologne.

Career

Academia

In 1995, Yakobson was appointed assistant professor of History at the University of Haifa through 1997. In 2000, he was appointed as a senior lecturer in history at the Hebrew University of Jerusalem. In 2011, he was appointed associate professor of Ancient history at the Hebrew University.

Political activism

Yakobson is a former Meretz activist and Peace Now member with a regular op-ed column in the newspaper Haaretz. He is a supporter of a two-state solution to the Israeli-Palestinian conflict. He co-wrote Israel and the Family of Nations: The Jewish Nation State and Human Rights with former Israeli minister Amnon Rubinstein, which seeks to assert Israel's right to exist as a Jewish state.

He is an Advisory Editor at "Fathom: For a deeper understanding of Israel and the region".

Works

See also

 Anatoly Yakobson 
 Maya Ulanovskaya
 Nadezhda Ulanovskaya
 Alexander Ulanovsky

References

External links

What does Israel's Arab minority really think?, Alexander Yakobson, Fathom: For a deeper understanding of Israel and the region, 26 April 2013
Alexander Yakobson's CV at the Hebrew University

Israeli historians
Israeli people of Russian-Jewish descent
Academic staff of the Hebrew University of Jerusalem
Living people
1959 births